Chace may refer to:

People

Surname Chace
 Arnold Buffum Chace (1845–1932), mathematician and chancellor of Brown University
 Burton W. Chace (1901–1972), former mayor of Long Beach, California
 Charles A. Chace (1822–1900), American politician
 Clyde Burgess Chace, builder of the Schindler House
 Elizabeth Buffum Chace (1806–1899), Quaker abolitionist, Underground Railroad station operator, and women's rights advocate
 Fenner A. Chace Jr. (1908-2004), American carcinologist
 Howard L. Chace, professor of Romance languages and author of Anguish Languish
 Jonathan Chace (1829–1917), Rhode Island senator
 James Chace (1931–2004), historian and foreign policy thinker
 Kiersten Dunbar Chace (born 1959) film producer, director, photographer
 Malcolm Greene Chace (1875–1955), financier, tennis player, hockey coach
 Malcolm Greene Chace, Jr., (1904–1996) chairman of Berkshire Hathaway during the 1960s
 Malcolm Greene Chace III (1934–2011), board of directors of Berkshire Hathaway 1992-2007
 Marian Chace (1896–1970), founder of modern dance therapy
 Oliver Chace (1769–1852), textile manufacturing industrialist
 Taylor Chace (born 1986), American sledge hockey player

First name Chace
 Chace Crawford (born 1985), American actor

School
 Chace Community School, secondary school in Enfield, England

Other
 French version of the caccia, a musical genre
 Chacé, municipality in the Maine-et-Loire department, France

See also
 Chase (disambiguation)